Jeroen Spitzenberger (born 20 January 1976) is a Dutch actor. He appeared in more than forty films since 1992.

Filmography

References

External links 

1976 births
Living people
Dutch male film actors
20th-century Dutch male actors
21st-century Dutch male actors